E major (or the key of E) is a major scale based on E, consisting of the pitches E, F, G, A, B, C, and D. Its key signature has four sharps. Its relative minor is C-sharp minor and its parallel minor is E minor. Its enharmonic equivalent, F-flat major, has eight flats, including the double-flat B, which makes it impractical to use.

The E major scale is:

Music in E major 
Antonio Vivaldi used this key for the "Spring" concerto from The Four Seasons.

Johann Sebastian Bach used E major for a violin concerto, as well as for his third partita for solo violin; the key is especially appropriate for the latter piece because its tonic (E) and subdominant (A) correspond to open strings on the violin, enhancing the tone colour (and ease of playing) of the bariolage in the first movement.

Only two of Joseph Haydn's 106 symphonies are in E major: No. 12 and No. 29. Furthermore, four string quartets (Op. 2/2 and Op. 3/1), Op. 17/1 and Op. 54/3), two piano trios (No. 11 and No. 44) and three piano sonatas (No. 13, 22 and 31) are in E major.

Luigi Boccherini's String Quintet, Op. 11, No. 5 is in E major.

Wolfgang Amadeus Mozart wrote only two compositions in E major: the Adagio for Violin and Orchestra KV 261 and the Piano Trio No. 4 KV 542.

Ludwig van Beethoven used E major for two of his piano sonatas, Op. 14/1 and Op. 109, and for the ouverture to his opera Fidelio.

Starting with Beethoven's Piano Concerto No. 3, several works in the key of C minor began to have slow movements in E major, three examples of which are Johannes Brahms' First Symphony and Piano Quartet No. 3, and Sergei Rachmaninoff's Piano Concerto No. 2.

Frédéric Chopin's First Piano Concerto starts in E minor, but the last two movements are in E major. His Étude Op. 10, No. 3, one of his best known works, is in E major. His last Nocturne, Op. 62 No. 2, and his final Scherzo No. 4, are also in E major.

In the 19th century, symphonies in this key were rare, with Anton Bruckner's Symphony No. 7 being one of very few examples (see list of symphonies in E major). For Bruckner, "the key of E major is frequently associated with music of contemplation".

Alexander Scriabin composed his First Symphony in E.

Two symphonies that begin in D minor and end in E major are Havergal Brian's Symphony No. 1 (Gothic) and Carl Nielsen's Symphony No. 4.

More typically, however, some symphonies that begin in E minor switch to E major for the finale, such as Sergei Rachmaninoff's Symphony No. 2, Pyotr Ilyich Tchaikovsky's Symphony No. 5 and Dmitri Shostakovich's Symphony No. 10.

In Gioachino Rossini's William Tell Overture, the first movement and the finale are in E major. Richard Wagner's Tannhäuser overture is also in E major.

The first of Claude Debussy's Two Arabesques, L. 66, is in E major.

The vast majority of Franz Liszt's Consolations are in E major.

See also
List of symphonies in E major

References

External links

Musical keys
Major scales